Roshni or Roshini is a given name.  Notable persons with that name include:

Roshini (actress), Indian actress
Roshini (singer), Indian singer
Roshini Kempadoo (born 1959), British photographer, artist, and academic
Roshini Thinakaran, Sri Lankan-American filmmaker
Roshni Chopra (born 1980), Indian actress
Roshni Dinaker, Indian costume designer and film director
Roshni Khatri (born 1996), Nepalese model, beauty pageant, and actress
Roshni Kaur Soin (born 1986), Singaporean beauty pageant
Roshni Nadar (born 1980/81), Indian business executive
Roshni Rastogi, Indian actress
Roshni Walia (born 2001), Indian actress
Roshini Haripriyan (born 1992), Indian television actress

Other
 Roshni (album), a 1999 album by Pakistani pop singer Hadiqa Kiyani
Roshni, a 2016 Pakistani drama serial